Livin My Best Life is the second studio album by American country music artist Dylan Scott, released on August 5, 2022 via Curb Records.

Critical reception 
Nicole Piering of Country Swag stated that "While Scott can do a party anthem with the best of them as evidenced on tracks like 'Amen to That' and 'Nothing to Do Town,' he shines when he's showing his softer side" and that "This is endlessly apparent on songs like 'Can't Have Mine,' 'Boy I Was Back Then,' 'Lay Down with You' and 'Tough'".

Paul Sammon of Six Shooter Country said: "Very much a country pop album with a tinge of Bro Country thrown in for good measure. But there’s also an element of Bible Belt, too. Something for everyone, I guess."

Track listing

Personnel
Adapted from liner notes.

Musicians
Matt Alderman - acoustic guitar (tracks 1, 4-6, 9, 11, 12, 15), programming (tracks 1, 3-7, 9-13, 15), background vocals (tracks 1-9, 11-13, 15)
Jimmie Allen - duet vocals (track 4)
Tommy Cecil - programming (track 13)
Darrick Cline - drums (tracks 14, 16)
Garrett Cline - bass guitar (tracks 14, 16)
Corey Crowder - programming (track 8)
Tim Galloway - acoustic guitar (track 11), electric guitar (track 11)
Curt Gibbs - acoustic guitar (tracks 14, 16)
Mark Hill - bass guitar (tracks 1, 9)
Mark Holman - programming (track 2)
Ben Johnson - programming (track 5)
Tony Lucido - bass guitar (tracks 4-6, 8, 15)
Miles McPherson - drums (track 12)
Katie Owen - background vocals (track 10)
Katlin Owen - acoustic guitar (tracks 2, 7, 8, 10, 13), electric guitar (tracks 3, 7, 8, 10, 12, 13)
Logan Robinson - acoustic guitar (tracks 14, 16), electric guitar (tracks 14, 16)
Scotty Sanders - steel guitar (track 14)
Justin Schipper - steel guitar (tracks 1, 4-6, 9, 10, 12)
Dylan Scott - acoustic guitar (track 12), lead vocals (all tracks)
Lars Thornton - fiddle (track 10), strings (track 10)
Ilya Toshinsky - acoustic guitar (tracks 1, 3-6, 9, 10, 12, 13, 15), banjo (track 10), electric guitar (tracks 3, 10, 13)
Will Weatherly - acoustic guitar (tracks 1, 4-6, 9, 11, 15), keyboards (track 11), programming (tracks 1, 4-6, 9-11, 15), background vocals (tracks 1, 4-6, 9, 11, 15)
Derek Wells - electric guitar (tracks 1, 4-6, 9, 15)
Dallas Wilson - electric guitar (track 3), programming (track 11), background vocals (track 3)
Alex Wright - keyboards (tracks 1, 7-11, 13, 15, 16), piano (track 16)
Nir Z. - drums (tracks 1, 2, 4-11, 13, 15), percussion (tracks 2, 4-7, 9-11, 15)

Production
Matt Alderman - producer (all tracks)
Curt Gibbs - producer (tracks 1, 9, 14, 16)
Mark Holman - producer (track 2)
Jim Ed Norman - producer (tracks 1, 9, 14-16)
Will Weatherly - producer (tracks 1, 2, 4-11, 13, 15)

Charts

References 

2022 albums
Albums produced by Jim Ed Norman
Curb Records albums
Dylan Scott albums